Jessel Miller (born 1949 Ontario, Canada) is an American watercolor artist and children's writer.

Life
Her father was a country doctor/artist, and mother was a festive singer, poet and entertainer.

She graduated from the University of Florida and moved to Oakland, California in 1971.

She had a one-person show at the San Francisco Museum of Modern Art in 1980, "Bay Area Personalities", watercolor portraits of Maya Angelou, Herb Caen, Louise Cavis, Melvin Belli and Dianne Feinstein.

In 1984 she opened the Jessel Gallery in Napa, California.

She writes and illustrates children's books.

Awards
 2002 American Book Award

Works

References

External links

1949 births
American children's writers
University of Florida alumni
Living people
Artists from Ontario
American women painters
American Book Award winners
21st-century American women artists